Pierre Hubert Alexandre Henri Appell (3 July 1887 - 19 December 1957) was a French politician.

Appell was born in Saint-Germain-en-Laye. Prior to the First World War, he was a serving naval officer. He was promoted to lieutenant in July 1917, and was second in command of the submarine Monge.

He represented the Republican-Socialist Party in the Chamber of Deputies from 1928 to 1936.

References

1887 births
1957 deaths
People from Saint-Germain-en-Laye
Politicians from Île-de-France
Republican-Socialist Party politicians
Members of the 14th Chamber of Deputies of the French Third Republic
Members of the 15th Chamber of Deputies of the French Third Republic
École Navale alumni
French military personnel of World War I
Recipients of the Croix de Guerre 1914–1918 (France)
Commandeurs of the Légion d'honneur